Kingseat is a village in Aberdeenshire, Scotland about  to the north-west of Aberdeen and  east of Newmachar.

History

Etymology 
The name Kingseat seems to originate from when King Malcolm Canmore rested at this location after the slaying of Macbeth at Battle of Lumphanan. The name "Kingseat" is visible on Maps dating back to 1652.

Kingseat Hospital 
Designed by Marshall Mackenzie Kingseat Hospital was the first segregate or village hospital system in the British Isles opened in 1904.

During World War II it was requisitioned by the Admiralty to be used as a Naval Auxiliary Hospital which it functioned as until 28 February 1946.

The hospital closed in 1994 but not before lending its name to the Kingseat Hospital in New Zealand.

Conservation & Residential Development 
The site was designated a conservation area in 2000 and plans were made to preserve the buildings by converting the site in to residential buildings.

Governance 
Kingseat is part of the Gordon county constituency for UK Parliament elections.

For Scottish elections Kingseat is part of the Aberdeenshire East constituency and part of the North East Scotland electoral region.

Kingseat is within the East Garioch ward which forms part of the Garioch administrative area of Aberdeenshire Council.

Newmachar Community Council represents the views of residents to Aberdeenshire Council and other public bodies. It has a statutory right to comment on all planning applications including all the major housing developments. The Council has nine elected members with elections held every three years.

Kingseat Community Association (an association brought around by the "Kingseat Matters" project which started in February 2013) held its first meeting on 18 June 2013 and the first committee meeting on 21 August 2013.. The group's aim is "to make Kingseat, Aberdeenshire an even better place to live and work." The group published a Kingseat Action Plan in 2014 and did a lot of work trying to force the site's main developers to finish the site's construction, they also organised various sports and community days. The group was dissolved in June 2020.

Geography 
Newmachar providing many of the local amenities such as the school, church, local shop and pubs.

Economy 
Kingseat Business Park is located to the east end of Kingseat. It has 3 large office buildings, including the Newmachar Business Centre, and 3 smaller units (known as pavilions) housing a Dentist and Childcare.

Culture and community 

Kingseat has a small play park, nature reserve and plenty of green areas. The playpark took many years to develop due to problems with the sites developer. Finally Aberdeenshire Council stepped in to carry out the works to develop the playpark and provide further community park facilities. The council intend to recoup the costs from the developer.

Unfortunately the developer of the main site has also not completed major works on a number of the old hospital buildings. This has meant the community is without a village hall but more distressingly the buildings at the center of Kingseat are surrounded by wire fences and have been since the development began (c 2004).

Sport 
Kingseat Fieldsporters Club meeting regularly in the Kingseat woods during summer for clay pigeon shooting. They were formed on 13 August 1986 by a small band of enthusiasts at Kingseat Hospital. The club has been affiliated to the British Association for Shooting and Conservation since 1989.

There are plans to create two football pitches at the south end of Kingseat Avenue (currently fields) but these are yet to be developed.

When the site was still a village hospital it had a football pitch, tennis courts and bowling green.

Education 
There is a childcare business at the east end of the village catering for babies up to pre-schoolers.

The nearest primary school is short distance away in Newmachar and the nearest secondary school in Dyce.

References 

Villages in Aberdeenshire